Humphry Henry Cobb (12 July 1873 – 13 December 1949) was an English first-class cricketer active 1896–1901 who played for Middlesex. He was born in Kensington; died in Camber.

References

1873 births
1949 deaths
English cricketers
Middlesex cricketers
Marylebone Cricket Club cricketers
Hertfordshire cricketers